Gefell is a town in the Saale-Orla-Kreis district, in Thuringia, Germany.

Overview
It is situated 16 km south of Schleiz, and 14 km northwest of Hof. It is where the Berlin professional audio company Georg Neumann GmbH relocated during World War II. During the time of the GDR, Gefell was in East Germany and private companies were nationalized, including this factory. Since reunification, the company, now known as Microtech Gefell, has specialized in microphones and is once again privately owned, this time by the families of managers of the pre-war Neumann company.

See also
Mödlareuth

References

External links

Saale-Orla-Kreis
Inner German border